Daryl Doran (born March 29, 1963) is a U.S. indoor soccer player.  His 827 games are the most of any player in American professional indoor soccer history. Doran previously coached the St. Louis Ambush in the Major Arena Soccer League from 2013–2015.

High school and college
Doran grew up in Saint Louis, Missouri, where he attended Christian Brothers College High School from 1977 to 1980.  He was a four-year starter with the school's Varsity soccer team, finishing his career with 35 goals and 31 assists. He was named All-State three times and named Parade All-American twice. The local St. Louis Steamers of the Major Indoor Soccer League (MISL) drafted Doran when he was in high school, but he declined the offer, and instead graduated and matriculated at St. Louis University. In December 1980, he was also selected by the Tampa Bay Rowdies in the second round of the North American Soccer League draft. The Steamers again drafted Doran during his freshman year of college.  This time, he left college and turned professional.

Playing career

Club
Doran played as a midfielder with the St. Louis Steamers until the team folded at the end of the 1987–1988 season.  With no professional team in St. Louis, Doran moved to the Los Angeles Lazers (MISL) for the 1988–1989 season.  However, the Lazers closed down at the end of the season and Doran moved back to St. Louis to sign with the expansion St. Louis Storm.  When the Storm shut down at the end of the 1991–1992 season, Doran jumped to the National Professional Soccer League (NPSL), and signed with the St. Louis Ambush.  He spent the next seven seasons with the Ambush as a midfielder, defender, and Player-coach.  He was a six-time All-Star, twice a first-team All-NPSL player, and 1997's Defender of the Year.  In 1999, Doran surprised St. Louis soccer fans when he left the Ambush for the resurrected St. Louis Steamers, now playing in the World Indoor Soccer League (WISL).  The Ambush folded at the end of the season while the Steamers spent the 2000 and 2001 seasons in the WISL, followed by two more seasons in the new Major Indoor Soccer League. In 2008 Doran signed with the St. Louis Illusion of the Professional Arena Soccer League (PASL).  Doran was the only player to play for every professional indoor soccer team in St. Louis until the Ambush were resurrected as a Major Arena Soccer League team (though he did coach them). Known for his incredible strength, Doran's personal best in the bench press was 385 pounds.

International
During his single season with the SLU Billikens, Doran was a United States men's national soccer team member but made no "A" international appearances.

In 1999, Doran played two games with the U.S. national futsal team.

Coaching career

In 1992, Doran began coaching the St. Louis Ambush.  The 1994–95 Ambush won the NPSL championship and Doran was named league Coach of the Year.  In 1999, Doran left the Ambush, replaced as head coach by Jamie Swanner.  Doran is in second place, behind Keith Tozer, on the NPSL list of coaching wins with 166.

Doran left coaching after the 2004–2005 season with the Steamers.

In April 2006, the Steamers retired his jersey number, the second to be retired after that of Slobo Ilijevski.  He is the Steamers' Vice President of Corporate Sales and Alumni Relations as well as owner and Athletic Trainer of Doran Fitness Center in O'Fallon, Missouri.

In 2013, Doran returned to coach the St. Louis Ambush of the Major Indoor Soccer League (MISL) as they were resurrected in St. Louis. Under Doran's direction, the Ambush play their home games at the Family Arena in St. Charles, Missouri.

After several failings and a 12-34 record from 2013 until 2015 Doran and assistant coach Joe Smugala were waived by the St. Louis Ambush. His was replaced by Tony Glavin.

Honors
NPSL Defender of the Year: 1997
NPSL First Team All Star: 1997, 1998
All Star Game MVP: 1997
NPSL Coach of the Year: 1994
St.Louis Sports Hall of Fame: 2015

References

External links
 MISL stats
 1981 NASL draft
 

Soccer players from St. Louis
American men's futsal players
American soccer players
Association football defenders
Los Angeles Lazers players
Saint Louis Billikens men's soccer players
St. Louis Ambush (1992–2000) players
St. Louis Steamers (WISL) players
St. Louis Steamers (2003–2006 MISL) players
St. Louis Storm players
Tampa Bay Rowdies draft picks
National Professional Soccer League (1984–2001) players
World Indoor Soccer League players
American soccer coaches
National Professional Soccer League (1984–2001) coaches
Professional Arena Soccer League players
Living people
1963 births
St. Louis Illusion players
St. Louis Ambush (1992–2000) coaches
St. Louis Ambush (2013–) coaches
Major Arena Soccer League coaches
Player-coaches